"Visions in Blue" is Ultravox's third single from the Quartet album, recorded in Air Studios, Montserrat and released on Chrysalis Records on 11 March 1983. The single peaked at #15 in the UK charts on 26 March.  A video was produced, but was banned by the BBC and MTV due to brief nudity; an edited version was later provided for broadcast on Top of the Pops.

The track also appears in live form on the CD version of Ultravox's 1983 in-concert album, Monument. The 12" version of "Visions in Blue" also contains an edited version of the same Monument performance of "Reap the Wild Wind".

Critical reception
At the moment of release David Hepworth of Smash Hits left negative review. As per him "Visions in Blue" "sounded awfully dirge-like."

Track listing

7" version
 "Visions in Blue" [single edit] – 4:13
 "Break Your Back" – 3:31

12" version
 "Visions in Blue" - 4:38
 "Reap the Wild Wind (live 6 Dec 82 at Hammersmith Odeon) " – 3:53
 "Break Your Back" – 3:31

Covers
The track has been covered by UK ebm/synthpop act Stok:holm and appears on their 2013 album City Lights.

References

1983 singles
Ultravox songs
Songs written by Midge Ure
Songs written by Chris Cross
Songs written by Billy Currie
Songs written by Warren Cann
Song recordings produced by George Martin
1982 songs
Chrysalis Records singles